Clima (Portuguese: Climate) was a cultural magazine published in Sao Paulo, Brazil. Ismail Xavier argues that although it existed for a brief period from 1941 to 1944, the magazine significantly influenced cultural criticism in Brazil.

History and profile
Clima was established in 1941, and the first issue appeared in May that year. The founders were the Brazilian intellectuals, who were called the Grupo Clima. The magazine was published on a monthly basis. One of the founders was Paulo Emilio Salles Gomes. The others included Antonio Candido, Décio de Almeida Prado, Gilda de Mello e Souza, Ruy Coelho and Lourival Gomes Machado. Antonio Candido also worked for the magazine as a literary critic. Clima existed until 1944.

References

1941 establishments in Brazil
1944 disestablishments in Brazil
Cultural magazines
Defunct magazines published in Brazil
Magazines established in 1941
Magazines disestablished in 1944
Magazines published in Brazil
Mass media in São Paulo
Monthly magazines published in Brazil
Portuguese-language magazines